Tor Egil Moxness Horn (born 1 April 1976) is a former Norwegian football goalkeeper who played his entire professional career for Norwegian team FK Bodø/Glimt.

He joined Bodø/Glimt from Brønnøysund IL in 1996, made his Norwegian Premier League debut in 1997 and became the first-team regular in 2001. He retired in March 2007 due to a long time knee injury.

References
100% Fotball- Norwegian Premier League statistics 

1976 births
Living people
Norwegian footballers
FK Bodø/Glimt players
Eliteserien players
Sportspeople from Nordland
Association football goalkeepers